Zé Maria is a nickname for various people with the given name José Maria, and may refer to these Brazilians:

Zé Maria (footballer, born 1931), born José Maria de Carvalho Sales, Brazilian football midfielder
Zé Maria (footballer, born 1939), born José Maria dos Santos Motta, Brazilian football defender
Zé Maria (footballer, born 1942), born José Maria da Silva, Brazilian football forward
Zé Maria (footballer, born 1949), born José Maria Rodrigues Alves, Brazilian football right-back who was 1970 FIFA World Cup champion
Zé Maria (politician) (born 1957), Brazilian politician
Zé Maria (footballer, born 1973), born José Marcelo Ferreira, Brazilian football wing-back who won bronze medal at the 1996 Summer Olympics
Zé Maria (footballer, born 1976), born José Mario Claudino, Brazilian football midfielder

See also
José María
Zémaria, Brazilian electro musical group